The Vice President of Syria is a political position in Syria. The Constitution states that in the case of the president's temporary disablement, the vice president may become acting president. Multiple people can hold the office of vice presidency at the same time. The president of Syria appoints vice presidents.

Vice President in Constitution
 The President of the Republic might name one or more deputies and delegate to them some of his authorities;
 The Vice-president is sworn in before the President of the Republic by repeating the constitutional oath mentioned in Article 7 of the Constitution. (Art. 91)
 If an impediment prevented the President of the Republic from continuing to carry out his duties, the Vice-president shall deputize for him. (Art. 92)
 No person carrying another nationality, in addition to the nationality of the Syrian Arab Republic, might occupy the office of  Vice-president. (Art. 152)

List of officeholders

Second Syrian Republic (1950–1958)

United Arab Republic (1958–1961)

Syrian Arab Republic (1961–present)

See also
President of Syria
List of presidents of Syria
Prime Minister of Syria
List of prime ministers of Syria
Speaker of the People's Assembly of Syria

References

Vice-President
Main
Syria